Igor Filippov (born 24 June 1961) is a painter from Sevastopol, Ukraine. Filippov has exhibited his works at many museums and festivals in Europe (Russia, Ukraine, Norway, Spain, Germany, France) and the United States.  He was also a professor of art at the Municipal Art School, Severodvinsk, Russia (1990–2003). The general theme of his work is "myths of different cultures."

Career
 School of Art at University of Education, St. Petersburg, Russia, 1986–1991, MFA
    Municipal Art Studio, Severodvinsk, Russia (1990–2003)
    Union of Arts of Russia (2000)
    Member of International Association of Art (2000)
    Association Internationale Des Arts Plastiques-IAA AIAP UNESCO (2000)

References

External links
 Official site

Ukrainian painters
Ukrainian male painters
Living people
Place of birth missing (living people)
1961 births